Khojali, Xocalı, Khodzhali, Khojalu, Khadzhaly, Khodzhaly, Khodzhallar or Khodgalou may refer to:

 Khojaly District, Azerbaijan
 Khojaly (town), Azerbaijan
 Xocalı, Khankendi, Azerbaijan
 Xocalı, Salyan, Azerbaijan
  (3313 m) in Abkhazia
 Khojali Osman, Sudanese artist

See also
 Khojaly–Gadabay culture, of the Late Bronze Age to Early Iron Age in the Karabakh region of Transcaucasia